Mário de Noronha (15 January 1885 – 9 July 1973) was a Portuguese fencer. He won a bronze medal in the team épée competition at the 1928 Summer Olympics.

References

External links
 

1885 births
1973 deaths
Portuguese male épée fencers
Olympic fencers of Portugal
Fencers at the 1924 Summer Olympics
Fencers at the 1928 Summer Olympics
Olympic bronze medalists for Portugal
Olympic medalists in fencing
Sportspeople from Lisbon
Medalists at the 1928 Summer Olympics
19th-century Portuguese people
20th-century Portuguese people